Sir Launcelot Dinadan James Henderson (born 20 November 1951), styled The Rt Hon. Lord Justice Henderson or Sir Launcelot Henderson, is a retired Lord Justice of Appeal.

Early life
The son of Peter Henderson, Lord Henderson of Brompton, he was educated at Westminster School and Balliol College, Oxford.

Career
He was called to the bar at Lincoln's Inn in 1977 and became a bencher there in 2004. He held appointment as Junior Counsel to the Inland Revenue. He was made a QC in 1995, deputy judge of the High Court from 2001 to 2007, and judge of the High Court of Justice (Chancery Division) from 2007 to 2016. On 13 September 2016, it was announced that he would join the Court of Appeal as a Lord Justice of Appeal from Autumn 2016. He took office on 3 November 2016 and his appointment to the Privy Council was announced 15 days later.

He is a Distinguished Fellow of All Souls College, Oxford.

References

1951 births
Living people
People educated at Westminster School, London
Alumni of Balliol College, Oxford
Members of Lincoln's Inn
Chancery Division judges
Fellows of All Souls College, Oxford
Members of the Privy Council of the United Kingdom
Knights Bachelor
Lords Justices of Appeal
English King's Counsel
Sons of life peers